"Sidaba Mapu" (literally,"Immortal God") or Salailel is the Supreme God, Creator of the universe and the Sky God in Meitei mythology and religion. According to Meitei mythology, Sidaba Mapu, being the Creator of the Universe, from a philosophical theory known as Leithak Leikharol Nongsemlon and Leisemlon (Leisemlon Ahanpa).

See also
 Sanamahi creation myth
 Meitei deities
 Lists of Creatures in Meitei Folklore

References

External links
 History of Manipur
 TRIBAL RESEARCH INSTITUTE

Meitei deities